RCH may stand for:

 Radio Club de Honduras, an amateur radio organization
 Railway Clearing House, the British financial clearing house and technical standards bureau for railways
 The Royal Canadian Hussars (Montreal), a unit of the Canadian Forces
 Royal Children's Hospital, Melbourne, Australia
 Royal Columbian Hospital, in New Westminster, British Columbia, Canada
 Almirante Padilla Airport (IATA airport code: RCH) in Riohacha, Colombia
 RCH (football club) (Racing Club Heemstede), in the Netherlands
 RCH (cars), a Greek kit and replica car manufacturer
 RCH, an American car made by Hupmobile c. 1912
 RCH, a call sign used by the United States Air Mobility Command